Kazankin is a Russian masculine surname, its feminine counterpart is Kazankina. It may refer to
Alexander Kazankin (1900–1955), Soviet military commander
Tatyana Kazankina (born 1951), Russian middle-distance runner

Russian-language surnames